Cranbourne West is a suburb in Melbourne, Victoria, Australia, 40 km south-east of Melbourne's Central Business District, located within the City of Casey local government area. Cranbourne West recorded a population of 19,969 at the 2021 census.

Cranbourne West has developed since the 1990s, and in 2006 had a new shopping centre opened called 'The Sandhurst Centre', on the corner of Duff Street and Monahans Road.

The Year 7-12 private Catholic School, St Peters College, is situated on Sladen Street in the far south of the suburb.

The Cranbourne West Development Plan was released in 2008 by the City of Casey and includes a large parcel of land bounded by Thompsons Road to the North, Evans Road to the East, Western Port Highway to the West, and the recently partially-built Ballarto Road and the urban growth boundary (as of 2012) to the south. New developments currently as of 2020 has a part of the planned large industrial area, a new Shopping Centre with a Woolworths Supermarket, housing, a network of parks and pathways, a primary school, and a planned secondary college. Low-density housing is provided for at the south of the parcel north of the urban growth boundary.

See also
 City of Cranbourne – Cranbourne West was previously within this former local government area.

References

Suburbs of Melbourne
Suburbs of the City of Casey